"Turn Me On" is a song by English DJ Riton and Dutch producer Oliver Heldens featuring English-American singer Vula. It was released on 13 September 2019 through Ministry of Sound Recordings. The drop fully incorporates the main melody from Yazoo's 1982 classic "Don't Go" while some of the lyrics reference 1977 song "Doctor Love" by American band First Choice. Marshall Jefferson released a remix of the song on 1 November 2019, which was well received by the two lead artists of the track. The single reached number one on Billboard's Dance/Mix Show Airplay Chart in November 2019, allowing Riton, Heldens, and Vula to each top that chart for the first time.

Background
During an interview for Official Charts Company, the two lead artists unveiled the genesis of the song. Riton said he had for the first time the idea to remix Yazoo song when he watched YouTube videos on their producer, Vince Clarke. He decided to send him the demo of Doctor Love/Turn Me On where he was into it. Then, he teamed with him and finished the work with Oliver Heldens. He later said to Billboard, "I always wanted to be the Alison Moyet to Vince Clarke in Yazoo. The lovely chap has let me sample his smash hit 'Don't Go'. I'm honoured. Thank you to the big man." Oliver Heldens said to Digital Journal that he followed Riton's idea to remix the track. He also complimented the project and Vula's vocals.

Critical reception
The song received positive criticism from multiple publications. Gaëtan Audeyer of French radio Virgin described the track as very danceable. Kat Bein of Billboard noted the number as "a retro club banger that'll put any modern dance fan in a futuristic fever". John Cameron of EDM.com deemed it "an infectious nightclub heater" with "an anthemic vocal [from Vula] that gives a song the sort of appeal that extends beyond the dance floor". BroadwayWorld TV News Desk called the single "an infectious slice of feel good house" which delivers "a masterfully modern take on the 1982 Yazoo classic 'Don't Go' - channelling a feelgood, club-ready revamp". Writing for German public broadcasting institution Westdeutscher Rundfunk, Daniel Vogrin noted Vula's voice as strong. Indeed, he added that she was featured in the gospel choir of Sam Smith's "Pray" and she is one of the main voices of London Community Gospel Choir. Ramona of German online platform of song lyrics Songtexte.com wrote that "the ingenious song makes for a perfect mix of retro and dance vibes", endowed with "an unmistakable melody" which perfectly makes "the connection to the original song".

Music video
A lyric video was first posted on 12 September 2019 through Oliver Heldens' YouTube channel. Then, the official music video, directed by Elliot Simpson, was released on 9 October 2019. The artists later stated that the video was influenced by Ministry of Sound music videos from the 2000s, like those made by Eric Prydz or Benny Benassi. The video depicts an out of control Dr Frankenstein character, Dr Love, played by actor and model Bernardo de La Rocque hell bent on injecting love into the lives of his patients by whatever means.

Track listing

Credits and personnel
Credits adapted from Tidal.

 Oliver Heldens – production, composition, lyrics
 Riton – production, composition, lyrics
 Allan Wayne Felder – composition, lyrics
 Iman Contahulten – composition, lyrics
 Norman Ray Harris – composition, lyrics
 Ronald Tyson – composition, lyrics
 Vince Clarke – composition, lyrics
 Mike Marsh – master engineering
 Serge Courtois – mix engineering
 Dipesh Parmar – programming
 Vula Malinga – vocals
 Hal Ritson – vocal production, vocals, record engineering

Charts

Weekly charts

Year-end charts

Certifications

References

External links
 

2019 songs
2019 singles
Riton (musician) songs
Oliver Heldens songs
Disco songs
Songs written by Allan Felder
Songs written by Norman Harris (musician)
Songs written by Oliver Heldens
Songs written by Vince Clarke
Ministry of Sound singles
Columbia Records singles
Sony Music singles